Rapala duma  or Abnormal Flash, is a butterfly in the family Lycaenidae. It was described by William Chapman Hewitson in 1878. It is  found in the Indomalayan realm.

Subspecies
R. d. duma (Burma, Thailand, Peninsular Malaysia, Singapore, Borneo, Sumatra)
R. d. abusina Fruhstorfer, 1912 (Java)

References

External links
"Rapala Moore, [1881]" at Markku Savela's Lepidoptera and Some Other Life Forms

Rapala (butterfly)
Butterflies described in 1878